Kedgwick is a Canadian incorporated rural community in northern New Brunswick, Canada. On 1 January 2023, Kedgwick annexed a large area including the local service districts of St. Jean Baptiste – Menneval and White's Brook, with parts of two others; revised census figures have not been released.

A variation of the original Micmac Madawamkedjwik, the name was "shortened by the river men to Tom Kedgwick or Kedgwick" (Ganong). Of uncertain meaning.  Appears as Grande Fourche, " Big Fork", on some maps; however, the older variant prevailed.

Forestry is the major industry in the area.

History
Originally a local improvement district, then an incorporated village, Kedgwick became a rural community in 2012 when it amalgamated with the surrounding local service district of the parish of Grimmer.

Geography
Located in the Appalachian Mountains in the western part of the county, Kedgwick is approximately 75 kilometres southwest of Campbellton and 15 kilometres east of the Restigouche River along Route 17.

Being surrounded by woods, Kedgwick is spectacular during the Fall season. Every autumn the population celebrates it with the "Festival d'Automne" (Fall fest).

Demographics

Population trend

Language
Mother tongue (2016)

Climate 
Kedgwick has a humid continental climate (Dfb) and once had a subarctic climate (Dfc). Summer consists of warm days and cool nights with about half of all days experiencing rain. Winter consists of cold days and frigid nights below zero with extremely heavy annual snowfall averaging 103 inches (261 cm). Kedgwick is one of the coldest and snowiest inhabited places in New Brunswick.

Notable people

See also
List of communities in New Brunswick

References

External links
Kedgwick.ca

Communities in Restigouche County, New Brunswick
Designated places in New Brunswick
Rural communities in New Brunswick